Eli Robert Carr (born January 19, 2001) is a footballer who plays as a midfielder for Puerto Rico national team. He is also a college soccer player for Longwood Lancers.

Career
Carr is a former Puerto Rican youth international. He has represented under-20 team at 2020 CONCACAF U-20 Championship qualifiers.

In January 2021, Carr received maiden call-up to senior team of Puerto Rico for friendlies against Dominican Republic and Guatemala. He made his senior team debut on March 28, 2021 in a 1–1 draw against Trinidad and Tobago.

Career statistics

International

References

External links
 

2001 births
Living people
Sportspeople from Fredericksburg, Virginia
Puerto Rican footballers
Puerto Rico youth international footballers
Puerto Rico international footballers
American soccer players
American sportspeople of Puerto Rican descent
Association football midfielders
Longwood Lancers men's soccer players